Göthe Grefbo (30 October 1921 – 17 May 1991) was a Swedish actor. He appeared in more than 70 films and television shows between 1948 and 1989.

Selected filmography

 Janne Vängmans bravader (1948) - Railroad worker (uncredited)
 Eva (1948) - Ticket Collector (uncredited)
 Janne Vängman på nya äventyr (1949) - Enok Holm
 Two Stories Up (1950) - Salvation Army Lieutenant
 Restaurant Intim (1950) - Restaurant guest (uncredited)
 Regementets ros (1950) - Chief of guards (uncredited)
 Defiance (1952) - Young man (uncredited)
 Farlig kurva (1952) - Frasse Svensson
 Summer with Monika (1953) - Lagerarbetare hos Forsbergs
 Barabbas (1953) - Man at Christian Meeting (uncredited)
 The Road to Klockrike (1953) - Emigrant som tas av polisen (uncredited)
 We Three Debutantes (1953) - Janitor at Svensk Plåtemalj (uncredited)
 Stupid Bom (1953) - Pettersson, city accountant
 Dance in the Smoke (1954) - Constable
 Wild Birds (1955) - Gang Member (uncredited)
 Friarannonsen (1955) - Poliskonstapel
 Den glade skomakaren (1955) - Janitor (uncredited)
 Night Child (1956) - Machine Operator (uncredited)
 The Staffan Stolle Story (1956) - Tolk
 More Than a Match for the Navy (1958) - Waiter
 The Jazz Boy (1958) - Teddys reklamchef
 Musik ombord (1958) - Kypare
 Fröken Chic (1959) - Teacher (uncredited)
 Swinging at the Castle (1959) - Erik Borg (uncredited)
 Crime in Paradise (1959) - Doorman (uncredited)
 Bara en kypare (1959) - Guest at Railroad Hotel Restaurant (uncredited)
 Svenska Floyd (1961) - Agent
 Rififi in Stockholm (1961) - Porter (uncredited)
 Min kära är en ros (1963)
 Badarna (1968) - Supervisor
 The Bookseller Gave Up Bathing (1969) - Priest
 Pippi Longstocking (1969) - Police constable Klang
 Eva - den utstötta (1969) - Gustav Bolinder
 Ni ljuger (1969) - Prison guard (uncredited)
 Pippi Goes on Board (1969) - Policeman Klang
 Dagmars Heta Trosor (1971) - Harold Hansen
 Lockfågeln (1971) - Lövgren
 Firmafesten (1972) - Karl-Ivar Pettersson, economic manager
 Emil och griseknoen (1973) - Kråkstorparen
 Bröllopet (1973) - Ivan Snell
 En enkel melodi (1974) - Patient
 What the Swedish Butler Saw (1975) - Judge Pettibone
 Bel Ami (1976) - Mr. Potts
 The Brothers Lionheart (1977) - Tengil's Guard
 Sverige åt svenskarna (1980) - Swedish army captain
 Barna från Blåsjöfjället' (1980) - Manne
 Raskenstam (1983) - Josef
 Kalabaliken i Bender (1983)
 Morrhår & ärtor (1986) - Hundman
 I lagens namn (1986) - Janitor
 Enkel resa'' (1988) - Steward

References

External links

1921 births
1991 deaths
20th-century Swedish male actors
Swedish male film actors
Swedish male television actors
People from Jämtland County